Washington Santana da Silva (born 20 January 1989) is a Brazilian footballer who plays for Portuguese club Feirense as a midfielder.

Biography
Washington started his career in São Paulo, for a small club Força. He was loaned to Figueirense in June 2006 but released in October. In August 2008 he left for Serbian club Teleoptik which is the satellite club of Serbian giants FK Partizan and where, playing along compatriots Alex dos Santos Gonçalves, Elton Martins and Jefferson Madeira, in the 2008–09 Serbian League Belgrade, Serbian third tier, have helped the club to finish second thus achieving promotion to Serbian second tier, the Serbian First League.

After playing with Teleoptik the first half of the 2009–10 Serbian First League, in December 2009 he returned to Brazil for Botafogo de Ribeirão Preto, until the end of 2010 Campeonato Paulista. He contract was extended until May 2011. After played in 2010 Campeonato Brasileiro Série D, he left for Tombense in September but immediately loaned to Campeonato Brasileiro Série A club Figueirense.

He scored his first goal on 16 January 2011 as a forward, in 2011 Campeonato Catarinense.

In 2012, he joined Cianorte Futebol Clube playing in the Campeonato Paranaense.

On 25 April 2015, Washington Santana joined Paraná.

On 27 January 2018, Panionios F.C. officially announced the signing of defensive midfielder Washington Santana Silva, who was recently released from Clube Desportivo das Aves for an undisclosed fee. He will replace Frenchman Kevin Tapoko in the squad of experienced manager Michalis Grigoriou's team.

Washington returned to Brasil in August 2018, signing for Vila Nova, before moving across the state to Atlético Goianiense in December 2018, for the 2019 season.

Honours
Campeonato Paulista do Interior: 2010

References

External sources
 

Brazilian footballers
Figueirense FC players
Clube Atlético Penapolense players
Botafogo Futebol Clube (SP) players
Joinville Esporte Clube players
Sociedade Esportiva Palmeiras players
FK Teleoptik players
C.D. Nacional players
C.D. Aves players
Panionios F.C. players
Vila Nova Futebol Clube players
Atlético Clube Goianiense players
Associação Atlética Ponte Preta players
Campeonato Brasileiro Série A players
Campeonato Brasileiro Série B players
Serbian First League players
Primeira Liga players
Brazilian expatriate footballers
Expatriate footballers in Serbia
Brazilian expatriate sportspeople in Serbia
Association football midfielders
Footballers from São Paulo
1989 births
Living people
Brazilian expatriate sportspeople in Portugal